Franco Nicolás Pérez (born 1 January 1996) is an Argentine professional footballer who plays as a forward for FC Tucson in USL League One on loan from Primera Nacional side Estudiantes.

Club career
Pérez began in Newell's Old Boys' youth, before appearing for the first-team in September 2015 for a victory away to Estudiantes (LP). On 31 August 2016, Liga MX side Morelia loaned Pérez. He made his professional debut with the club on 9 August 2017 during a Copa MX group stage meeting with Necaxa, he was substituted on for Jorge Zárate with twenty-seven minutes remaining and subsequently scored Morelia's goal in a 1–1 draw. He mainly featured for the club's reserve team, Morelia Premier, in Liga Premier; scoring nine in thirty appearances; including a brace over Alacranes de Durango.

Pérez returned to Newell's Old Boys in 2018, prior to joining Deportivo Madryn on loan in August. He scored goals against Alvarado and Chaco For Ever whilst with the club. July 2019 saw Pérez leave Newell's permanently, as he penned terms with Primera Nacional's Estudiantes. Six months later, after just three appearances, Pérez moved across the division to Independiente Rivadavia on loan. Three games occurred. He departed during 2020, before heading to the United States on 11 March 2021 to join USL League One side FC Tucson.

International career
Pérez represented Argentina's U17s in 2013. He appeared at both the 2013 South American Under-17 Football Championship and 2013 FIFA U-17 World Cup. Pérez scored two goals at the former in Argentina, netting against Peru and Colombia as Argentina went on to win the title. He featured twice at the U17 World Cup in the United Arab Emirates, versus Canada and Mexico respectively.

Career statistics
.

Honours
Argentina U17
South American Under-17 Football Championship: 2013

References

External links

1996 births
Living people
Sportspeople from Córdoba Province, Argentina
Argentine footballers
Argentina youth international footballers
Association football forwards
Argentine expatriate footballers
Expatriate footballers in Mexico
Expatriate soccer players in the United States
Argentine expatriate sportspeople in Mexico
Argentine expatriate sportspeople in the United States
Liga MX players
Liga Premier de México players
Torneo Federal A players
Primera Nacional players
Newell's Old Boys footballers
Atlético Morelia players
Monarcas Morelia Premier players
Deportivo Madryn players
Estudiantes de Río Cuarto footballers
Independiente Rivadavia footballers
FC Tucson players